The 1940 Kentucky Derby was the 66th running of the Kentucky Derby. The race took place on May 4, 1940.

Full results

 Winning breeder: Robert A. Fairbairn (KY)

References

1940
Kentucky Derby
Derby
May 1940 sports events